The Edge  is a landmark mixed use (hotel and residential) tower on hold in Beirut, Lebanon.

See also
List of tallest buildings in Lebanon
List of tallest buildings in the world by country
List of tallest structures in the Middle East

References

Hotels in Beirut